Faveria mundalis is a species of moth in the family Pyralidae. It was described by Francis Walker in 1863. It is found on Seram Island.

References

Moths described in 1863
Phycitini
Moths of Indonesia